Nikola Petković (born 23 September 1996) is a Serbian professional footballer who plays for Slovenian PrvaLiga club Mura. He can play as an attacking midfielder or striker.

Career
Petković started his professional career with hometown Lokomotiva Beograd in the 2014–15 season. In the 2016–17 season, he was the top goalscorer of the fourth-tier Belgrade Zone League, helping the team to win the championship. He started the 2017–18 season with the club, only to sign a contract in the mid-season with top-tier Javor Ivanjica until the end of the 2020–21 season. In ten appearances in the 2017–18 Serbian SuperLiga, he scored one goal as Javor relegated to the second-tier Serbian First League. In the 2018–19 season, he emerged as club's leading scorer, finishing the season with 22 goals over 37 matches, which placed him as second top goalscorer of the 2018–19 Serbian First League. Javor Ivanjica gained promotion that season to the Serbian SuperLiga.

In the 2019–20 season of the Serbian top-tier Serbian SuperLiga, Petković continued with the good performances from the past season, scoring 10 goals in 17 games until 23 November 2019. In November 2019, Javor reportedly agreed with Partizan on his transfer in the winter's mid-season transfer window. However, the transfer was not realized and Petković continued playing for Javor in the second half of the season. He joined French team Chambly on 4 July 2020.

Career statistics

Honours

Individual
Serbian SuperLiga Top Scorer: 2019–20 (16 goals, shared with Nenad Lukić and Vladimir Silađi)

References

External links
 

1996 births
Living people
Footballers from Belgrade
Association football midfielders
Serbian footballers
Serbian expatriate footballers
FK Javor Ivanjica players
FC Chambly Oise players
NŠ Mura players
Serbian SuperLiga players
Serbian First League players
Ligue 2 players
Championnat National players
Slovenian PrvaLiga players
Serbian expatriate sportspeople in France
Expatriate footballers in France
Serbian expatriate sportspeople in Slovenia
Expatriate footballers in Slovenia